Jamesport Meeting House is a historic meeting house located at Jamesport in Suffolk County, New York. It is in the form of a 2-story gable-fronted building with a -story wing to the east.  It features an open bell tower topped by a two-tiered, four-sided Mansard roof.

It was added to the National Register of Historic Places in 2009.

References

External links

Jamesport Meeting House Preservation Trust
Jamesport Church (Bygone Long Island)

Churches on the National Register of Historic Places in New York (state)
Buildings and structures in Suffolk County, New York
National Register of Historic Places in Suffolk County, New York